Kalar District is a district of the Sulaymaniyah Governorate in Kurdistan Region, Iraq.

References 

Districts of Sulaymaniyah Province
Geography of Iraqi Kurdistan